The 2020 season was Felda United's 14th competitive season and 2nd season in the Malaysia Super League since the club's promotion to the Malaysia Super League after only a one-year absence, winning the Malaysia Premier League. The club's license from the Football Association of Malaysia (FAM) has been obtained to continue their tracks in the Malaysian Football League.

This season was club's final season before been dissolved.

Players

First-team squad

Appearances and goals

Competitions

Malaysia Super League

References 

Felda United F.C.
Malaysian football clubs 2020 season